Larry O'Gorman (born October 1967 in Wexford, Ireland) is a retired Irish sportsperson.  He played hurling with his local club Faythe Harriers and with the Wexford senior inter-county team in from the 1987 until 2004.

O'Gorman is considered one of the heroes of the Wexford hurling team that won the All-Ireland title in 1996.  It was the first win for the county since 1968.  Throughout his career O'Gorman, who generally played in the half-back line, won 1 All-Ireland title and 2 Leinster Championship titles (1996 and 1997).  His contribution in 1996 earned him the title of Player of the Year, and Texaco hurler of the year.

In 2004, O'Gorman retired from inter-county hurling.

References

1967 births
Living people
Faythe Harriers hurlers
Wexford inter-county hurlers
All-Ireland Senior Hurling Championship winners
All Stars Hurlers of the Year